Anthony Bleecker Banks (March 7, 1835 – August 6, 1910) was an American book publisher and politician from New York.

Life
He was born on March 7, 1835, in New York City, the son of David Banks (born 1786), a law book publisher, and Harriet Brenecke (Lloyd) Banks. He graduated from Columbia College. Then he learned the printing and publishing trade, and in 1857 took over the management of the Albany branch of his father's publishing house.

He was a member of the New York State Assembly (Albany County, 3rd D.) in 1862. On July 6, 1866, he married Phoebe Wells (born 1837), and they had two children.

He was a member of the New York State Senate (13th D.) from 1868 to 1871, sitting in the 91st, 92nd, 93rd and 94th New York State Legislatures.

He was Mayor of Albany from 1876 to 1878, and from 1884 to 1886.

He was found guilty of violating the fish and game laws by taking partridge and quail when they were out of season. In January 1908, the New York Supreme Court, Appellate Division upheld the verdict, and Banks had to pay $648.76 in damages and costs.

He died on August 6, 1910, at his summer residence in Bar Harbor, Hancock County, Maine; and was buried at the Green-Wood Cemetery in Brooklyn.

Sources
 The New York Civil List compiled by Franklin Benjamin Hough, Stephen C. Hutchins and Edgar Albert Werner (1870; pg. 444 and 495)
 Life Sketches of the State Officers, Senators, and Members of the Assembly of the State of New York in 1868 by S. R. Harlow & S. C. Hutchins (pg. 59f)
 GAME CONVICTION AFFIRMED in NYT on January 9, 1908
 Anthony Bleecker Banks in NYT on August 8, 1910
 Banks genealogy at RootsWeb

External links

1835 births
1910 deaths
Democratic Party New York (state) state senators
Politicians from New York City
Mayors of Albany, New York
Columbia College (New York) alumni
Burials at Green-Wood Cemetery
New York (state) politicians convicted of crimes
19th-century American politicians